Caradrina camina is a species of cutworm or dart moth in the family Noctuidae. It is found in North America.

The MONA or Hodges number for Caradrina camina is 9655.

Subspecies
These three subspecies belong to the species Caradrina camina:
 Caradrina camina alpha Barnes & Benjamin, 1926
 Caradrina camina beta Barnes & Benjamin, 1926
 Caradrina camina camina

References

Further reading

 
 
 

Caradrinini
Articles created by Qbugbot
Moths described in 1894